The 1991 Tendring District Council election took place on 2 May 1991 to elect members of Tendring District Council in England. This was on the same day as other local elections.

At the election, the Liberal Democrats emerged as the largest party on the council for the first time since its creation in 1973. The Conservatives fell to second placed and Labour recovered their position to become the third largest party.

Summary

Election result

Ward results
Below are the full results for the election.

Alresford & Thorrington

Ardleigh

Beaumont & Thorpe

Bockings Elm

Bradfield, Wrabness & Wix

Brightlingsea East

Brightlingsea West

Elmstead

Frinton

Golf Green

Great & Little Oakley

Great Bentley

Great Bromley & Little Bromley

Harwich East

Harwich East Central

Harwich West

Harwich West Central

Haven

Holland & Kirby

Lawford & Manningtree

Little Clacton

Mistley

Ramsey & Parkeston

Rush Green

Southcliff

St. Bartholomew's

St. James

St. John's

St. Mary's

St. Osyth & Point Clear

Tendring & Weeley

Walton

References

1991 English local elections
1991